Garland Ellis Burrell Jr. (born July 4, 1947) is an inactive Senior United States district judge of the United States District Court for the Eastern District of California.

Biography

Born in Los Angeles, California, Burrell was in the United States Marine Corps during the Vietnam War, from 1966 to 1968. He received a Bachelor of Arts degree from California State University, Los Angeles in 1972, a Master of Social Work from the George Warren Brown School of Social Work at Washington University in St. Louis in 1976, and a Juris Doctor from California Western School of Law in San Diego in 1976.

In 1972, he was the manager of a liquor store based in Los Angeles, California. From 1974 to 1976 he served as a law clerk for three different organizations and law firms before becoming a legal intern with the San Diego District Attorney's Office in 1976.

He was a deputy district attorney of Sacramento, California from 1976 to 1978, and then a deputy city attorney for that city from 1978 to 1979. He was a deputy chief of the Civil Division of the United States Attorney's Office for the Eastern District of California from 1979 to 1985. He was a business litigator, Stockman Law Corporation from 1985 to 1986. He was a senior deputy attorney of Sacramento from 1986 to 1990, and then returned to the United States Attorney's Office as chief of the Civil Division until 1992.

Federal judicial service

On August 1, 1991, Burrell was nominated by President George H. W. Bush to a new seat on the United States District Court for the Eastern District of California created by 104 Stat. 5089. He was confirmed by the United States Senate on February 27, 1992, and received his commission on March 2, 1992. He served as Chief Judge from 2007 to 2008. Burrell assumed senior status effective July 4, 2012.

See also 
 List of African-American federal judges
 List of African-American jurists

References

Sources
 

1947 births
Living people
African-American judges
Assistant United States Attorneys
California State University, Los Angeles alumni
California Western School of Law alumni
Judges of the United States District Court for the Eastern District of California
Lawyers from Los Angeles
United States district court judges appointed by George H. W. Bush
20th-century American judges
United States Marines
George Warren Brown School of Social Work alumni
21st-century American judges